Curie Institute may refer to:

 Curie Institute (Paris), a research foundation.
 Curie Institute (Warsaw), a cancer research and treatment center